This was the first season of Barnes FC following its foundation in 1862.  Since a standard set of laws of football did not yet exist (the Football Association would not be founded until 1863), Barnes drew up its own rules to govern play, choosing to prohibit carrying the ball.  Though its rules stated that "the season shall commence on the first Saturday in October", Barnes FC's first game (against neighbouring Richmond FC) is not recorded until the end of November.  In December, Barnes played Blackheath FC, a club which played a rugby-style game that allowed running with the ball and "hacking" (kicking opponents in the shins).  The resulting clash of styles forced "mutual concessions" to be made as to the rules for this game.  It was nevertheless a lively match, featuring "dangerous mélées" in which club captain Ebenezer Morley narrowly escaped being "garrotted".  In the first half of 1863, Barnes played against N.N. Club and Forest FC (later renamed Wanderers FC), two teams who, like Barnes, preferred a dribbling game; both would join Barnes in becoming founder members of the Football Association later that year.

Notes

Barnes F.C. seasons
Barnes